Lifeforce Records is a German heavy metal independent record label that specializes in metalcore and death metal. Their roster contains bands such as Confession, This or the Apocalypse, Omnium Gatherum and Last Leaf Down, and they have helped to launch the careers of bands who went on to larger labels, such as Heaven Shall Burn, Between the Buried and Me, Caliban and Trivium.

While Lifeforce has signed and continues to sign both European and American artists, they announced in October 2002 that they were going to shift focus away from the latter market following the breakup of Endthisday and Beyond the Sixth Seal, as well as Between the Buried and Me's (who were at the time one of their most successful bands) move from the label to Victory Records.

Bands

Current

 Abnormal Thought Patterns
 Anatagonist A.D
 Confession
 Deadlock
 Devilish Impressions
 Doyle Airence
 Eden Circus
 Fake Idols
 Grand Exit
 Hanging Garden
 Last Leaf Down
 Lay Siege
 Lifeforms
 Man Must Die
 Miseration
 Name
 Omnium Gatherum
 Pigeon Toe
 Promethee
 Red Eleven
 Raunchy
 Ready, Set, Fall!
 Shear
 Sons of Aeon
 The Chant
 The Last Felony
 This or the Apocalypse
 Thränenkind
 We Are the Damned

Past

At the Soundawn
Between the Buried and Me
Beyond the Sixth Seal
Burning Skies
By Night
Caliban
Cataract
Constraint
Cipher System
Darwin
Deadsoil
Death Before Disco
Destinity
Destiny
Dioramic
End This Day
Endstand
Enforsaken
Fall of Serenity
Fear My Thoughts
Hackneyed
Hand to Hand
Heaven Shall Burn
Hell Within
Herod
Intronaut
Last Winter
Left to Vanish
Liar
Light Pupil Dilate
Mindfield
Nahemah
Nervecell
Nightrage
One Without
Seneca
Sunrise
Raintime
The Blackout Argument
The Psyke Project
The Underwater
The Year of Our Lord
Trivium
Veil
War From a Harlots Mouth
Winterus
Withered

See also
 List of record labels
 List of Lifeforce artists

References

External links

 
 

German record labels
Heavy metal record labels
Death metal record labels
Hardcore record labels